Mario Verduzco is an American football coach. He was most recently the quarterbacks coach at the University of Nebraska–Lincoln He was one of four offensive assistants dismissed on November 8, 2021, in a major reshuffle of the offensive staff.

References

Year of birth missing (living people)
Living people
Missouri State Bears football coaches
Nebraska Cornhuskers football coaches
Northern Iowa Panthers football coaches
Rutgers Scarlet Knights football coaches
San Jose State Spartans football coaches
UCF Knights football coaches
High school football coaches in California
Junior college football coaches in the United States
San Jose State University alumni
People from Pittsburg, California
Sportspeople from the San Francisco Bay Area